The 2021 Nordic Junior Artistic Gymnastics Championships was an artistic gymnastics competition held virtually. The event was held between 29–31 October.

Medalists

References 

Nordic
Nordic